Sheldon Westcott (born August 10, 1985) is a Canadian mixed martial artist who competes in the Welterweight division of the Ultimate Fighting Championship (UFC). He is also known for being a contestant and finalist on The Ultimate Fighter for Team Canada.

Mixed martial arts career
After losing his debut fight to Victor Bachmann in 2007, Wescott would go on to his next four fights, three of them were stopped in less than a minute. Sheldon was set to make his return to MFC to take on former King of the Cage Welterweight Champion Thomas Denny. They fought to split draw. The two would meet again at MFC 30, Wescott won via unanimous decision.

The Ultimate Fighter: Nations
After going 8-1 Westcott would be a cast member on The Ultimate Fighter Nations: Canada vs. Australia, representing Canada at middleweight.

Westcott first defeated Daniel Kelly via arm-triangle in round one to advance to the semi-final. Sheldon would advance to the finals after submitting Vik Grujic in the first round via guillotine choke.

Ultimate Fighting Championship
Westcott made his official debut facing one of his teammates, Elias Theodorou in the middleweight finals at The Ultimate Fighter Nations Finale. He lost via TKO in the second round.

Westcott was expected to face Alberto Mina on August 23, 2014 at UFC Fight Night 48. However, in the days leading up to the event, Westcott pulled out of the bout citing an injury and was replaced by Shinsho Anzai.

Westcott returned to the cage in April, 2015 and faced Pawel Pawlak at UFC Fight Night 64. He lost via unanimous decision.

Westcott faced Edgar García on January 2, 2016 at UFC 195. He won via TKO in the first round.

Westcott was expected to face Alex Morono on February 4, 2017 at UFC Fight Night 104. However, Westcott pulled out of the fight in early January and was replaced by Niko Price.

Westcott was expected to face Danny Roberts on December 16, 2017 at UFC on Fox 26. However, Westcott was removed from the card for undisclosed reasons in early December and was replaced by Nordine Taleb.

Championships and accomplishments
Ultimate Fighting Championship
The Ultimate Fighter Nations: Canada vs. Australia Middleweight Tournament Runner-Up
The Ultimate Fighter Nations: Canada vs. Australia Performance of the Season

Mixed martial arts record

|-
|Win
|align=center|9–3–1
| Edgar García
| TKO (punches)
| UFC 195 
| 
| align=center|1
| align=center|3:12
|Las Vegas, Nevada, United States
|
|-
|Loss
|align=center|8–3–1
| Pawel Pawlak
| Decision (unanimous)
| UFC Fight Night: Gonzaga vs. Cro Cop 2
| 
| align=center| 3
| align=center| 5:00
|Krakow, Poland
|
|-
|Loss
|align=center|8–2–1
| Elias Theodorou
|TKO (punches and elbows)
|The Ultimate Fighter Nations Finale: Bisping vs. Kennedy
|
|align=center|2
|align=center|4:41
|Quebec City, Quebec, Canada
|
|-
|Win
|align=center|8–1–1
| Aaron Shmyr
| Submission (guillotine choke)
| Fivestar Fight League 5
| 
|align=center|1
|align=center|0:13
|Yellowknife, Northwest Territories, Canada
|
|-
|Win
|align=center|7–1–1
| Nic Herron-Webb
| Decision (unanimous)
| AFC 17: Anarchy
| 
|align=center|3
|align=center|5:00
|Edmonton, Alberta, Canada
|
|-
|Win
|align=center|6–1–1
| Jay Jensen
| Submission (guillotine choke)
| AMMA 9: Ford vs. Goodall
| 
|align=center|1
|align=center|0:26
|Edmonton, Alberta, Canada
|
|-
|Win
|align=center|5–1–1
| Thomas Denny
| Decision (unanimous)
| MFC 30: Up Close & Personal
| 
| align=center|3
| align=center|5:00
|Edmonton, Alberta, Canada
|
|-
|Draw
|align=center|4–1–1
| Thomas Denny
| Draw (split)
| MFC 28: Supremacy
| 
| align=center|3
| align=center|5:00
|Enoch, Alberta, Canada
|
|-
|Win
|align=center|4–1
| Simon Marini
| Submission (guillotine choke)
| AMMA 4: Victory
| 
|align=center|1
|align=center|0:28
|Edmonton, Alberta, Canada
|
|-
|Win
|align=center|3–1
| Tim Smith
| TKO (punches)
| TFC 10: High Voltage
| 
|align=center|1
|align=center|0:29
|Edmonton, Alberta, Canada
|
|-
|Win
|align=center|2–1
| Kyle Millberry
| TKO (punches)
| Heat XC 1
| 
|align=center|1
|align=center|0:51
|Edmonton, Alberta, Canada
|
|-
|Win
|align=center|1–1
| Jeff Kilisolsky
| Submission (guillotine choke)
| MFC 18: Famous
| 
|align=center|1
|align=center|3:33
|Enoch, Alberta, Canada
|
|-
|Loss
|align=center|0–1
| Victor Bachmann
| Decision (split)
| King of the Cage: Brawl in the Mall
| 
|align=center|3
|align=center|5:00
|Edmonton, Alberta, Canada
|

Mixed martial arts exhibition record

|-
|Win
|align=center|2–0
| Vik Grujic
| Submission (guillotine choke)
| The Ultimate Fighter Nations: Canada vs. Australia
| (airdate)
|align=center|1
|align=center|4:15
|Quebec City, Quebec, Canada
| Semi-finals.
|-
|Win
|align=center|1–0
| Dan Kelly
| Submission (arm-triangle choke)
| The Ultimate Fighter Nations: Canada vs. Australia
| (airdate)
|align=center|1
|align=center|0:56
|Quebec City, Quebec, Canada
| Elimination Round.

See also
 List of male mixed martial artists
 List of Canadian UFC fighters

References

External links
 
 

Living people
1984 births
Sportspeople from Edmonton
Canadian male mixed martial artists
Welterweight mixed martial artists
Ultimate Fighting Championship male fighters